Kim Loraine Appleby (born 28 August 1961) is an English singer, songwriter, and actress. She participated in the duo Mel and Kim, with her sister Melanie Appleby, until her sister's death from pneumonia following treatment for cancer.

Solo music career 
Kim released her first solo album Kim Appleby, in November 1990. The album included songs co-written with Mel for what was intended to be the next "Mel and Kim" album, alongside other songs that Kim had composed following Mel's death. One of these songs, "Don't Worry", was selected as the first single, and reached number two in the British charts in November 1990, as well as being a hit in Europe. As a result, "Don't Worry" was nominated for an Ivor Novello Award for Best Contemporary Song in 1991.

A follow up single "G.L.A.D." was a UK No. 10 hit. Subsequent singles from her debut album were "Mama" (No. 19) and "If You Cared" (No. 44).

Kim's second album, Breakaway, only received a limited release. However, she released three further singles, "Light of the World" (No. 41, 1993), "Breakaway" (No. 56, 1993) and "Free Spirit" (No. 51, 1994), which saw her reunite with Stock and Aitken.

British Academy of Songwriter, Composers and Authors 
In 1994, Appleby decided that she wanted to take a break from being a recording artist to concentrate purely on song writing for other acts. As a result, she spent some time in Sweden working with songwriter Anders Bagge, co-founder of the Murlyn Music Group. She has also collaborated with Michael Garvin ("Never Give Up on A Good Thing") as well as Sheppard Solomon (Britney Spears, Kelly Clarkson, Natalie Imbruglia).

She also worked closely with the British Academy of Songwriters, Composers and Authors (BASCA) where she chaired the Ivor Novello Awards judges panel for Best Contemporary Song for over ten years, and previously the Best Song Musically and Lyrically for two years.

Return to releasing music and performing 

A download only single called "High" was released in 2007.

In December 2010, the single "Took a Minute" by Levthand featuring Kim Appleby was released in Europe.

In September 2016 a promo CD was issued for a new song called "What's Not to Love', which was co-written with Dominic King.

In January 2018, a previously unreleased track "Where Is Love" was released through Dancing Nation Records.

In 2018, Kim returned to performing live after 20 years.

In 2018, Kim co-presented the three-part series on BBC Four "Smashing Hits! The 80s Pop Map of Britain and Ireland" with Midge Ure. 

In October 2019, Cherry Red Records released a Mel and Kim singles box set.

Discography

Albums
Kim Appleby (1990) – UK No. 23, AUS No. 159, AUT No. 30, GER No. 45, NED No. 65, SWE No. 24, SWI No. 36.  Certified gold in the UK.
Breakaway (1993)

Singles

2004: "Believe" (Whiteman feat. Kim Appleby) [German promo CD]
2010: "Took a Minute" (Levthand feat. Kim Appleby)
2011: "The World Today Is a Mess" (Levthand feat. Kim Appleby)
2017: "Whatever Makes You Happy" (Vicarious Bliss feat. Kim Appleby)
2022: "I Need Love" (Levthand feat. Kim Appleby)

References

External links

Official Mel and Kim website

1961 births
English television actresses
20th-century British women singers
English songwriters
Actresses from London
Living people
Mel and Kim members